District 64 may refer to:
 Park Ridge-Niles School District 64
 Pennsylvania House of Representatives, District 64
 Texas's 64th House of Representatives district
 Wisconsin's 64th Assembly district
 Iowa's 64th House of Representatives district